Benton Township is an inactive township in Knox County, in the U.S. state of Missouri.

Benton Township has the name of Thomas Hart Benton, a state legislator.

References

Townships in Missouri
Townships in Knox County, Missouri